The following elections occurred in the year 1901.

Africa
 1901 Liberian general election

Europe
 1901 Dalmatian parliamentary election
 1901 Danish Folketing election
 1901 Dutch general election
 1901 Portuguese legislative election

United Kingdom
 1901 Maidstone by-election
 1901 Monmouth Boroughs by-election
 1901 Saffron Walden by-election

North America
 1901 Cuban general election

Canada
 1901 Edmonton municipal election
 1901 Nova Scotia general election

United States
 1901 South Carolina's 7th congressional district special election

Oceania

Australia
 1901 Australian federal election
 1901 Western Australian state election

New Zealand
 1901 Caversham by-election
 1901 City of Christchurch by-election

South America
 1901 Chilean presidential election

See also
 :Category:1901 elections

1901
Elections